The Broxbourne Council election, 2004 was held to elect council members of the Broxbourne Borough Council, the local government authority of the borough of Broxbourne,  Hertfordshire, England.

Composition of expiring seats before election

Election results

Results summary 
An election was held in 12 out of the 13 wards on 10 June 2004. (No election in Rosedale Ward)

All seats were successfully defended by the incumbent party.

The new political balance of the council following this election was:

Conservative 34 seats
Labour 2 seats
British National Party 1 seat
Independent 1 seat

Ward results

References

2004
2004 English local elections
2000s in Hertfordshire